Slomi is a settlement in the Municipality of Dornava in northeastern Slovenia. It lies on the southeastern edge of the Slovene Hills, just north of Dornava on the road to Polenšak. The area is part of the traditional region of Styria. It is now included with the rest of the municipality in the Drava Statistical Region.

References

External links
Slomi on Geopedia

Populated places in the Municipality of Dornava